Maria Sharapova and Tamarine Tanasugarn were the defending champions, but decided to focus on the singles tournament only. Sharapova would eventually win the title.

Shinobu Asagoe and Katarina Srebotnik won the title by defeating Jennifer Hopkins and Mashona Washington 6–1, 6–4 in the final.

Seeds

Draw

Draw

References

External links
 Official results archive (ITF)
 Official results archive (WTA)

2004 Japan Open Tennis Championships